The Imperial City of Nuremberg was a free imperial city – independent city-state – within the Holy Roman Empire. After Nuremberg gained piecemeal independence from the Burgraviate of Nuremberg in the High Middle Ages and considerable territory from Bavaria in the Landshut War of Succession, it grew to become one of the largest and most important Imperial cities, the 'unofficial capital' of the Empire, particularly because numerous Imperial Diets and courts met at Nuremberg Castle between 1211 and 1543. Because of the many Diets of Nuremberg, Nuremberg became an important routine place of the administration of the Empire during this time. The Golden Bull of 1356, issued by Emperor Charles IV (reigned 1346–78), named Nuremberg as the city where newly elected kings of Germany must hold their first Imperial Diet, making Nuremberg one of the three highest cities of the Empire.

The cultural flowering of Nuremberg, in the 15th and 16th centuries, made it the center of the German Renaissance. Increased trade routes elsewhere and the ravages of the major European wars of the 17th and 18th centuries caused the city to decline and incur sizeable debts, resulting in the city's absorption into the new Kingdom of Bavaria on the signing of the Confederation of the Rhine in 1806, becoming one of the many territorial casualties of the Napoleonic Wars in a period known as the German mediatisation.

Middle Ages 

First evidence of a settlement in the Nuremberg area can be detected as early as the year 1050 BC. Later the Celts settled in the Nuremberg area,  400 BC. The area of the city of Nuremberg itself – and especially today's old town – has detectable traces of a settlement as early as the 9th century. At that time, present-day Nuremberg was on the border between the Bavarian  and the stem duchy of Franconia. From 1050 to 1571, the city expanded and rose dramatically in importance due to its location on key trade routes.

King Conrad III established a burgraviate and the first administration and courts over the surrounding Imperial territories. The first burgraves were from the Austrian House of Raab but, with the extinction of their male line around 1190, the burgraviate was inherited by the last count's son-in-law, of the House of Hohenzollern. From the late 12th century to the Interregnum (1254–73), however, the power of the burgraves diminished as the Staufen emperors transferred most non-military powers to a castellan, with the city administration and the municipal courts handed over to an Imperial mayor from 1173/74. This castellan not only administered the imperial lands surrounding Nuremberg, but levied taxes and constituted the highest judicial court in matters relating to poaching and forestry; he also was the appointed protector of the various ecclesiastical establishments, churches and monasteries, even of the Prince-Bishopric of Bamberg. The privileges of this castellanship were transferred to the city during the late-14th and early-15th centuries. The strained relations between the burgraves and the castellan finally broke out into open enmity, which greatly influenced the history of the city.

Nuremberg is often referred to as having been the 'unofficial capital' of the Holy Roman Empire, particularly because Imperial Diets and courts met at Nuremberg Castle. The Diets of Nuremberg were an important part of the administrative structure of the empire. The increasing demands of the royal court and the increasing importance of the city attracted increased trade and commerce to Nuremberg, supported by the Hohenstaufen emperors. Nuremberg soon became, with Augsburg, one of the two great trade centers on the route from Italy to Northern Europe.

In 1298, the Jews of the town were accused of having desecrated the host and 698 were slain in one of the many  massacres. Behind the massacre in 1298 was also the desire to combine the northern and southern parts of the city, which were divided by the  river. Jews had been settled in that flood-prone area, but as the city leaders realised, this center of town was crucial to its future development. Hence, they decided that the Jewish population had to be removed.

The largest gains for Nuremberg were in the 14th century, with Louis the Bavarian (reigned 1314–47) and Charles IV (reigned 1346–78) expanding the city's powers and granting improved customs privileges. Charles's Golden Bull of 1356 named Nuremberg as the city where newly elected kings of Germany must hold their first Imperial Diet, making Nuremberg one of the three highest cities of the Empire, along with Frankfurt, where kings were elected, and Aachen, where Emperors were crowned and which had been the capital of the old Frankish Empire. The royal and Imperial connection was strengthened when Sigismund of Luxembourg (reigned 1411–37) granted the Imperial regalia to be kept permanently in Nuremberg in 1423. These remained in Nuremberg until 1796, when the advance of French troops required their removal to Regensburg and thence to Vienna, where they found a new home.

Charles IV had strong ties to Nuremberg, staying within its city walls 52 times and thereby strengthening its reputation amongst German cities.

Until the mid-13th century, the Lesser, reigning, Council consisted of 13 magistrates and 13 councillors; towards the end of the century 8 members of the practically unimportant Great Council were added, and, from 1370, 8 representatives of artisans' associations. The members of the council were chosen by the wealthier class; this custom led to the establishment of a circle of "eligibles", to which the artisan class was strongly opposed since it excluded them politically. With the increasing importance of handicraft, a spirit of independence developed among the artisans, and they determined to have a voice in the city government. This uprising was mainly political, with the agitators siding with the Wittelsbachs in the dispute over the German kingship between Louis's Bavarian heirs and the patricians, who sided with Emperor Charles. The result of this uprising was a ban on any self-organisation of the artisans in the city, abolishing the guilds that were customary elsewhere in Europe; the unions were then dissolved, and the oligarchs remained in power while Nuremberg was a free city.

Charles IV conferred upon the city the right to conclude alliances independently, thereby placing it upon a politically equal footing with the princes of the empire. The city protected itself from hostile attacks by a wall and successfully defended its extensive trade against the burgraves. Frequent fights took place with the burgraves without, however, inflicting lasting damage upon the city. After the castle had been destroyed by fire in 1420 during a feud between Frederick IV (since 1417 margrave of Brandenburg) and the duke of Bavaria-Ingolstadt, the ruins and the forest belonging to the castle were purchased by the city (1427), resulting in the city's total sovereignty within its borders; The castle had been ceded to the city by Emperor Sigismund in 1422, on the sole condition that the Imperial suite of rooms be reserved for the Emperor's use. Through these and other acquisitions the city accumulated considerable territory.

In 1431, the population was about 22,800 including 7146 persons qualified to bear arms, 381 secular and regular priests, 744 Jews and non-citizens. As an emerging regional power, however Nuremberg soon came into conflict with the old dynasty, the former burgraves, who had brought large areas of the region around the city under their control as the Margrave of Brandenburg-Kulmbach and Elector of Brandenburg. This conflict came to a head in the First Margrave War in 1449–50, when Albert III Achilles, Elector of Brandenburg, tried in vain to restore his former rights over the city. The Hussite Wars, recurrence of the Black Death in 1437 and the First Margrave War had reduced the city's population to 20,800 by 1450.

Early modern age 

The cultural flowering of Nuremberg, in the 15th and 16th centuries, made it the center of the German Renaissance. The years between 1470 and 1530 are generally regarded as the city's heyday. Nuremberg traded in virtually all of the then-known world:  ("Nuremberg trinkets go all through the land") and Nuremberg's wealth was known as "the Imperial Treasure Chest". The city's revenues were said to have been greater than those of the whole kingdom of Bohemia.

The city government was exclusively run by about 50 wealthy patrician families who had an exclusive access to the "inner city council", such as the famous Tucher, Imhoff and Haller, a branch of the Welsers from Augsburg, and others, while newer families were also successful in trading. By the 15th century, more than half of the older families had extinguished and 22 new families were admitted to the "inner council". With the enactment of the dance statute of 1521, the circle of councilable families was finally established and the patriciate of then forty-two families was closed. Later, only very few further families were admitted. Among the ruling patricians were also the Behaim, Ebner von Eschenbach, Fürer von Haimendorf, Geuder von Heroldsberg, Grundherr, Gugel, Harsdörffer (Harsdorf), Hirschvogel, Holzschuher, Koler, Kress von Kressenstein, Löffelholz von Kolberg, Muffel, Nützel, Oelhafen, Paumgartner, Peller, Pfinzing, Pirckheimer, Pömer, Rieter, Rummel, Scheurl, Schürstab, Stromer, Volckamer. 
Many of these wealthy families became important patrons of art. At that time, many notable artists lived and worked in Nuremberg, such as Albrecht Dürer (1471–1528), Martin Behaim (1459–1507) built the first globe and Peter Henlein ( 1485–1542) produced the first pocket watch. Also notable from this period are the woodcarver Veit Stoss (1447–1533), the sculptor Adam Kraft ( 1460–1508/09) and the master founder and sculptor Peter Vischer the Elder ( 1460–1529). Only literature was not as dominant as the other arts, but  (lyric poet), playwright and shoemaker Hans Sachs (1494–1576) provides at least one major literary figure who lived at this time in Nuremberg.

Nuremberg was one of the founding 27 territories of the Franconian Circle at the Diet of Augsburg on 2 July 1500. In 1525, Nuremberg accepted the Protestant Reformation, and in 1532, the religious Peace of Nuremberg, by which the Lutherans gained important concessions, was signed there. During the 1552 revolution against Charles V in the Second Margrave War, Nuremberg endeavoured to purchase its neutrality by the payment of 100,000 guilder; but Albert Alcibiades, Margrave of Brandenburg-Kulmbach, one of the leaders of the revolt, attacked the city without declaring war and forced the conclusion of a disadvantageous peace. At the Peace of Augsburg, the possessions of the Protestants were confirmed by the Emperor, their religious privileges extended and their independence from the jurisdiction of the Bishop of Bamberg affirmed, while the 1520s' secularisation of the monasteries was also approved.

The state of affairs in the early 16th century, Columbus's discovery of the New World and Dias's circumnavigation of Africa and the territorial fragmentation in the Empire led to a decline in trade and, thus, the city's affluence. The ossification of the social hierarchy and legal structures contributed to the decline in trade; under Leopold I (reigned 1658–1705) the patriciate was converted to a hereditary corporation, leading the merchant class to appeal to the Imperial counsellor, albeit unsuccessfully. During the Thirty Years' War it did not always succeed in preserving its policy of neutrality. Frequent quartering of Imperial, Swedish and League soldiers, war-contributions, demands for arms, semi-compulsory presents to commanders of the warring armies and the cessation of trade, caused irreparable damage to the city. The population, which in 1620 had been over 45,000, sank to 25,000. In 1632 during the Thirty Years' War, the city, occupied by the forces of Gustavus Adolphus of Sweden, was besieged by the army of Imperial general Albrecht von Wallenstein. The city declined after the war and recovered its importance only in the 19th century, when it grew as an industrial center.

After the Thirty Years' War, Nuremberg attempted to remain detached from external affairs, but contributions were demanded for the War of the Austrian Succession and the Seven Years' War, the former amounting to 6.5 million guilder. Restrictions of imports and exports deprived the city of many markets for its manufactures, especially in Austria, Prussia and Bavaria, eastern and northern Europe. In 1790/91, the Bavarian elector, Charles Theodore, appropriated part of the land obtained by the city during the Landshut War of succession, to which Bavaria had maintained its claim; Prussia claimed and occupied part of the territory in 1796. Realising its weakness, the city asked to be incorporated into Prussia but Frederick William II refused, fearing to offend Austria, Russia and France. At the Imperial diet in 1803, the independence of Nuremberg was affirmed, but on the signing of the Confederation of the Rhine on 12 July 1806, it was agreed to hand the city over to Bavaria from 8 September; its population was then 25,200 and its public debt totalled 12.5 million guilder, with Bavaria guaranteeing their amortisation.

Territory 

The area was divided into the Old and New Districts ( and ). The Old District, which also included Imperial forests, was a conglomeration of lordships and possessions of Nuremberg burghers, monasteries and social facilities. That high justice (Zentgericht and Freigericht) was administered by the burgraviate – and subsequently the margraviates of Brandenburg-Ansbach and Brandenburg-Bayreuth – was a source of constant conflict. The New District is made up of the territory gained by Nuremberg in the Landshut War of Succession; in this territory, the city had full sovereignty. In 1790, around 25,000 lived with city walls and a further 35,000 in the extramural territories of the city.

The territorial expansion of imperial cities since the mid-14th century had several general causes, all found in the case of Nuremberg – the weakness of imperial power and an inability to maintain law and order; the debt crisis of neighbouring landed and knightly nobles in comparison with the capital income of the burgeoning urban middle classes; and the growing need for cities to secure an adequate supply of food for its inhabitants, raw materials for its craftsmen, and military self-protection. Before the end of the 18th century, with Bavarian and Prussian annexation of Nuremberger territory, the city territory was as described below:

Old District 

Within but especially outside of the Old District, there were also exclaves that were indirect estates and possessions of Nuremberg citizens and of former religious institutions (such as the monasteries secularised by the city in the 16th century) and charitable institutions (in particular the ). The  ("Nuremberg rural alms ") alone – responsible, amongst other things, for the land of the former Nuremberger monasteries – managed around 1790 properties in over 500 locations. In 1497, excluding the exclaves, the Old District available to Nuremberg, there were over 28,000 people, living in 5780 households in 780 towns. These tenants owed to the Imperial city allegiance, obedience, military service and tax obligations.

New District 
In 1504/05, the New District comprised  in the following places, all now in  except where indicated:
 
 
 
 , bought in 1503 now in )
 ,  and 
 , now in 
  (now in ) was successively acquired, in 1347 by Nuremberger families and in 1536 by the city itself
 , purchased in 1406, now in 

The structure of the Nuremberg  resembles the administrative structure of the Electoral Palatinate and the duchies of Bavaria office structure prior to 1504. In 1513, the Nuremberg  were placed under the newly created  as an intermediate authority.

Gradual mediatisation from 1790 

In both Margraves' Wars (1449/50 and 1552–54) and in the Thirty Years' War, the city's territory and its population were violently affected by quartering of troops, looting, troop movements and disease.

In 1790/91, the Electorate used its historic claim from before the Landshut War of Succession to occupy Nuremberger territories in what became known as the Bavarian Sequestrations.

The power-play over the Nuremberger legacy saw the Electorate providing goodwill and support to Revolutionary France in competition with Prussia, to whom the two Franconian margraviates had fallen in 1791. Since then, the Minister President of Prussia,  (1750–1822), had been trying to create an integral Prussian Province of Franconia. When Prussia, in the course of her , had already claimed the margravial rights of high justice over the Old District in 1796, Nuremberg was all but restricted to the territory circumscribed by town walls; Nuremberg retained the right of high justice only over the reduced  and the exclaves within the Prince-Bishopric of Bamberg, also diminished by annexation by the Electorate.

References

Sources
 
 
 
 

Nuremberg
Franconian Circle
Free imperial cities
States and territories established in 1219
States and territories disestablished in 1806